Zinc finger homeobox 2 is a protein that in humans is encoded by the ZFHX2 gene. It has been implicated in pain insensitivity.

References 

Human proteins